is a private university in Mito, Ibaraki, Japan, established in 1983. The predecessor of the school was founded in 1909.
California State University, Fresno & California State University, Northridge's Japanese Department has had an active international student exchange program with this university since 2004.

Publications 
The university publishes the journal International Perspectives in Victimology, .

References

External links
 Official website 

Educational institutions established in 1909
Private universities and colleges in Japan
Universities and colleges in Ibaraki Prefecture
1909 establishments in Japan
Mito, Ibaraki